The Forester Sisters were an American country music vocal group consisting of sisters Kathy, June, Kim, and Christy Forester. The group's discography consists of 11 studio albums, four compilation albums and 22 singles. Between 1985 and 1992, the group charted 20 singles on the Billboard Hot Country Songs chart.

Albums

Studio albums

Christmas albums

Gospel albums

Compilation albums

Singles

As a featured artist

Music videos

References

Country music discographies
Discographies of American artists